Hendrikus "Hendrik" Colijn (22 June 1869 – 18 September 1944) was a Dutch politician of the Anti-Revolutionary Party (ARP; now defunct and merged into the Christian Democratic Appeal or CDA). He served as Prime Minister of the Netherlands from 4 August 1925 until 8 March 1926, and from 26 May 1933 until 10 August 1939.

Early life
He was born on 22 June 1869 in the Haarlemmermeer to Antonie Colijn and Anna Verkuijl, who had migrated to the newly-created Haarlemmermeer polder from the Land of Heusden and Altena for religious reasons. He was the first of six children, all of whom were born in Haarlemmermeer. Colijn grew up in the Land of Altena.

Military service
At the age of 16, he went to a military academy in Kampen for officer training, where he graduated as a second lieutenant in 1892. On 18 September 1893, he married Helena Groenenberg (23 September 1867 – 14 February 1947) and was sent to the Dutch East Indies. During his 16 years in the Dutch East Indies, he spent ten years in the colonial army. He served in the Aceh War as the lieutenant of J. B. van Heutsz and six further years in the colonial administration as a lieutenant when van Heutsz became Governor General in 1904.

Colijn's letters to his wife from his period on Lombok reveal that his participation in acts of brutality which by modern standards would be considered severe war crimes:

I have seen a mother carrying a child of about 6 months old on her left arm, with a long lance in her right hand, who was running in our direction. One of our bullets killed the mother as well as the child. From now on we couldn't give any mercy, it was over. I did give orders to gather a group of 9 women and 3 children who asked for mercy and they were shot all together. It was not a pleasant job, but something else was impossible. Our soldiers tacked them with pleasure with their bayonets. It was horrible. I will stop reporting now.

Early political career
After his return to the Netherlands in 1909, he was elected as an Anti-Revolutionary Party Member of Parliament for the district of Sneek (before 1918, the Dutch voting system was the same as the British).

In 1911, he was appointed Minister of War and revised the Dutch Selective Service System. In May 1918, he acted as an intermediary between the British and Kaiser Wilhelm II of Germany to arrange an armistice, resulting in the Wilhelm gaining refuge in the Netherlands.

Business life
In 1910, the Holland Dakota Landbouw Compagnie was established, with Hendrikus Colijn and his brother Arie Colijn as the primary shareholders.

From 1914 to 1922, he served as CEO for the Bataafse Petroleum Maatschappij (BPM). In 1925, he also became CEO of Royal Dutch Shell.

Prime minister
In 1922, he accepted the political leadership of the Anti-Revolutionary Party (Calvinist) from Abraham Kuyper. Only one year later, he succeeded the resigning Dirk Jan de Geer as Minister of Finance. In 1925, Colijn also became prime minister, but a year later, he had to step down when the House of Representatives accepted a resolution by Gerrit Hendrik Kersten of the Protestant Reformed Political Party that called for diplomatic ties with the Vatican to be broken. That was unacceptable to the Roman Catholic State Party, which was then in government. Colijn then returned to the Senate and from 1927 to 1929 served as head of the Dutch delegation to the League of Nations in Geneva. At the election of 1929, he was elected for the House of Representatives, and he immediately became parliamentary leader of his party. That proved to be a success sincr at the election of 1933, the ARP gained two seats, and Colijn became prime minister again.

From 1933 to 1939, he served four more times as prime minister. During the 1930ss, his government faced the effects of the Great Depression, which took a heavy toll on the Netherlands. Colijn's government responded to the economic crisis with a strict protectionist policy, which continued to weaken the Dutch economy. Colijn's decision to adhere to the gold standard until 1936, long after most of the trading partners of the Netherlands had dropped it, was very unpopular with those in favour of government fiat money.

In 1939, his last cabinet, with Protestant and liberal ministers but without Catholic ministers, lasted only three days before a government crisis. He resigned as prime minister on 10 August, only three weeks before the outbreak of World War II.

World War II and death
After the Dutch defeat in the Battle of the Netherlands in 1940, he published an essay entitled "On the Border of Two Worlds" (Op de Grens van Twee Werelden) in which he called for accepting German leadership in Europe immediately after the Royal House had fled to England and left him behind. His view was influenced by the tremendous show of force that the German blitzkrieg had shown and the relative weakness of the Allied forces. Soon thereafter, he tried to organize political resistance but was arrested in June 1941 and taken to Berlin for interrogation. The Germans tried to have him confess that he had conspired with the British to invade the Netherlands to serve as an excuse for the German invasion.

Late in the war, according to a grandson, after the tide had turned against the Germans, Heinrich Himmler wanted to keep Colijn available as a possible intermediary with the British, as he had done earlier for Wilhelm II. The very fact that the Gestapo allowed the visit suggests that Himmler was already making contingency plans in case of a German loss. In March 1943, Colijn was put under house arrest in a remote mountain hotel in Ilmenau, where he died on 18 September 1944.

Decorations

References

External links

Official
  Dr. H. (Hendrik) Colijn Parlement & Politiek
  Dr. H. Colijn (ARP) Eerste Kamer der Staten-Generaal
 

1869 births
1944 deaths
Anti-Revolutionary Party politicians
Chairmen of the Anti-Revolutionary Party
Directors of Shell plc
Dutch chief executives in the oil industry
Dutch civil servants
Dutch corporate directors
Dutch magazine editors
Dutch people of World War II
Dutch prisoners of war in World War II
Graduates of the Koninklijke Militaire Academie
Reformed Churches Christians from the Netherlands
Knights Grand Cross of the Order of Orange-Nassau
Knights Third Class of the Military Order of William
Royal Netherlands East Indies Army officers
Recipients of the Order of the Netherlands Lion
Recipients of the Order of the House of Orange
Ministers of Colonial Affairs of the Netherlands
Ministers of Defence of the Netherlands
Ministers of Economic Affairs of the Netherlands
Ministers of Finance of the Netherlands
Ministers of Foreign Affairs of the Netherlands
Ministers of Transport and Water Management of the Netherlands
Ministers of State (Netherlands)
Ministers of the Navy of the Netherlands
Ministers of War of the Netherlands
Members of the Senate (Netherlands)
Members of the House of Representatives (Netherlands)
Leaders of the Anti-Revolutionary Party
People from Haarlemmermeer
Prime Ministers of the Netherlands
Prisoners who died in German detention
World War II political leaders
World War II prisoners of war held by Germany
19th-century Dutch East Indies people
20th-century Dutch businesspeople
20th-century Dutch civil servants
20th-century Dutch East Indies people
20th-century Dutch educators
20th-century Dutch military personnel
20th-century Dutch politicians